Kiribati have competed in five Commonwealth Games, making their debut in 1998 and attending every subsequent Games to date. At the 2014 Commonwealth Games, David Katoatau won Kiribati's first medal, a gold, in men's weightlifting 105 kg.

History
Kiribati first participated at the 1998 Commonwealth Games in Kuala Lumpur. Sixteen years later at the 2014 Commonwealth Games in Glasgow, the country achieved its first-ever gold medal when David Katoatau won the men's 105 kg in the final.

Medal tally

See also
All-time medal tally of Commonwealth Games

References

 
Nations at the Commonwealth Games